The Argentine Federal Penitentiary Service (Spanish: Servicio Penitenciario Federal Argentino, SPF) is an Argentine federal agency responsible for the administration of the national prison system.

The legal unification of the prison system occurred by Decree Law No. 412 of January 14, 1958, which was ratified on October 23 of that year.

See also

Argentine Federal Police
Federal Penitentiary Service Intelligence
Buenos Aires Police
Santa Fe Province Police
Interior Security System

References

External links
 Argentine Federal Penitentiary Service 
Official website  (Archive)

Federal law enforcement agencies of Argentina
Prison and correctional agencies